Broad Run is a tributary of Little Muncy Creek in Lycoming County, Pennsylvania, in the United States. At least one bridge has been constructed over the stream, carrying State Route 2067. Broad Run is classified as a Coldwater Fishery.

Course

Broad Run begins on Ball Ridge in Moreland Township. It flows south-southeast for a few tenths of a mile before turning south-southwest for several tenths of a mile, crossing Pennsylvania Route 118, and receiving an unnamed tributary from the right. The stream then turns south-southeast for several tenths of a mile, flowing through a valley, before receiving a very short unnamed tributary from the left and turning south-southwest. After a few tenths of a mile, it receives another unnamed tributary from the right, and several tenths of a mile further downstream, it turns west-southwest for a short distance and receives an unnamed tributary from the right before turning south-southwest and then west-southwest. After several tenths of a mile, the stream receives an unnamed tributary from the right and turns south-southwest for several tenths of a mile, reaching the end of its valley. It then turns west for a short distance before turning south and reaching its confluence with Little Muncy Creek.

Geography and geology

Watershed and biology

The stream is entirely within the United States Geological Survey quadrangle of Hughesville. Its mouth is located within  of Moreland.

Broad Run is classified as a Coldwater Fishery.

History
Broad Run was entered into the Geographic Names Information System on August 2, 1979. Its identifier in the Geographic Names Information System is 1170290.

A bridge rehabilitation project involving substructure repair of six bridges in Lycoming County, including one carrying State Route 2067 over Broad Run, for a total cost of $1,530,000.

In 2016, XTO Energy was issued an Erosion and Sediment Control Permit for which one of the receiving waterbodies was Broad Run.

See also
Laurel Run (Little Muncy Creek), next tributary of Little Muncy Creek going downstream
German Run, next tributary of Little Muncy Creek going upstream
List of rivers of Pennsylvania

References

Rivers of Lycoming County, Pennsylvania
Tributaries of Muncy Creek
Rivers of Pennsylvania